The Cathedral Church of St Thomas of Canterbury, commonly known as Portsmouth Cathedral, is an Anglican cathedral church in the centre of Old Portsmouth in Portsmouth, England. It is the cathedral of the Diocese of Portsmouth and the seat of the bishop of Portsmouth.

The Anglican cathedral is one of the two cathedral churches in the city, the other being the Roman Catholic Cathedral of St John the Evangelist, Portsmouth, about one mile to the north.

History

Around the year 1180, Jean de Gisors, a wealthy Norman merchant and Lord of the Manor of Titchfield, gave land in his new town of Portsmouth to the Augustinian canons of Southwick Priory so that they could build a chapel "to the Glorious Honour of the Martyr Thomas of Canterbury, one time Archbishop, on (my) land which is called Sudewede, the island of Portsea". It was given so that they could build a chapel dedicated to the honour of St Thomas of Canterbury, who was assassinated and martyred ten years earlier. This chapel was to become, in turn, a parish church in the 14th century and then a cathedral in the 20th century.

The medieval building, dedicated in 1188, was cruciform in shape, with a central tower, which was used as a lookout point and lighthouse, over the crossing. Of the original building, only the chancel and the transepts remain. The church survived a French raid in 1337 which had laid waste most of Portsmouth during the Hundred Years War. However, in 1449, Adam Moleyns, Bishop of Chichester, was murdered by local sailors. The town's inhabitants were excommunicated and the church was closed. In 1591, Elizabeth I worshipped in St Thomas's Church.

During the English Civil War, when the Parliamentary forces attacked the town in 1642, the Royalist garrison used the church tower to observe the movement of enemy forces. Parliamentary gunners positioned in Gosport fired on the tower and inflicted damage to the church. This resulted in the ruin of the medieval tower and nave. With the restoration of the monarchy in 1660 came the authorisation by Charles II for a collection in churches across the country to raise the £9,000 required to rebuild the tower and nave, which took place from 1683 to 1693. The nave was built in the classical style. Galleries were added in 1708 to cater for growing congregations, and were extended in 1750. The wooden cupola with a lantern for shipping was added to the top of the tower in 1703. A ring of eight bells was given at the same time. Two additional bells were cast in 1957 and currently the central tower contains a total of 12 bells. All of the bells were cast at Taylor's Bell Foundry and are hung in the wooden octagonal part of the tower. Various repairs and alterations were made during the eighteenth and nineteenth centuries. In 1902, the church was closed for two years so that much-needed work on the foundations could be carried out. During this period, St Mary's Colewort, a chapel of ease, served as the temporary parish church.

Cathedral

The establishment of the Diocese of Portsmouth out of part of the Diocese of Winchester in 1927 brought about significant changes. On 1 May of that year, the parish church of St Thomas of Canterbury became the pro-cathedral of the new diocese, becoming the second cathedral in Portsmouth, as the Roman Catholic Cathedral of St John the Evangelist had already opened in 1882. At a chapter meeting in October 1932, a first sketch plan for an extension to the church was submitted by Charles Nicholson. He was called upon to extend the church to a size that would dignify its cathedral status; by 1935 the "provisional" nature of its title had been dropped.

The style that Nicholson chose is that of a round-arched "Neo-Byzantine" style that echoed the "classical" style of the late seventeenth century quire. By 1939 the outer quire aisles, the tower, the transepts and three bays of the nave had been completed. The base of the seventeenth century tower had been opened up to form the tower arch. However, with the Fall of France in June 1940 during World War II, work on the extension scheme stopped and the bays of the nave were blocked off with a "temporary" brick wall. This wall remained there for over fifty years. During the Second World War, the Cathedral suffered minor damage to the windows and the roof. Nicholson died in 1949 and attempts headed by Bernard Montgomery to finish the structure in the 1960s proved unsuccessful due to substantive failure to find sufficient funds. Plans published in 1966 by Seely & Paget, with Pier Luigi Nervi as consulting engineer, envisaged a large semi-circular western extension 76 feet wide, constructed of reinforced concrete. The vast extension would have allowed for a congregation of 1,200 to have an interrupted view of the nave altar. However, as the building had been used for many years without its extension, it was quite usable and there was no urgency to finish the work. By the mid-1980s, however, the "temporary" brick wall was found to have become unstable and in danger of collapse, which made the completion work pressing. The task of the architects was to find a solution to the problem of finishing Nicholson's truncated nave: the nave was originally intended in the 1930s plans to be longer, in the traditional style of an English cathedral, but the changing needs of the diocese meant that the building was finally built with a foreshortened nave, the final west wall being located close to where the temporary structure had been. Efforts were started to raise the £3 million necessary to carry out the plans. Work began in January 1990 and eventually a fourth bay of the nave, western towers, tower rooms, rose window, gallery, ambulatory, together with the stone altar beneath Nicholson's tester and the new stone font were added. In November 1991, the completed building, much smaller than the original plans envisaged, was consecrated in the presence of Queen Elizabeth The Queen Mother.

Architecture

The formal entrance into the cathedral is through the bronze west doors, designed by Bryan Kneale. The design is based on the tree of life, an ancient symbol representing the renewal of life. The completed nave is a square space that is enclosed by an outer ambulatory. The ambulatory is low and vaulted. Because the furniture in the nave is not fixed, it can be used for various means, including concerts and exhibitions as well as services. On the rood screen, beneath the nave organ case is a sculpture called Christus by Peter Eugene Ball. The nave organ case was designed by Didier Grassin in 2001; the inside of the panels were designed by Patrick Caulfield. The left side depicts night, with a stylised lighthouse shining on the sea (which alludes to the City of Portsmouth's motto, "Heaven's Light Our Guide"). The right door depicts day, showing the sun and the hull of a fishing boat.

The tower is pierced to provide an organ loft raised on a low dark passage. The font (1991), made to a Greek design of the ninth century, is placed centrally between the nave and the quire. In the south tower transept is the bronze statue of St John the Baptist by David Wynne. It was cast in 1951 as a memorial to a Winchester College pupil killed on the Matterhorn. On the north wall of the south tower transept is the painting The Miraculous Draught of Fishes by William Lionel Wyllie. The north tower transept contains a ceramic plaque of the Virgin and Child by the Florentine sculptor Andrea della Robbia. The principal altar stands on a podium of Purbeck stone, with mosaic work by Richard Noviss. The lectern was the gift of Edward VII in 1903. The pulpit was installed in 1693 and is all that remains of a three-decker pulpit. The organ case, built by Francis Bird, with carved figures of cherubs and King David playing his harp, belongs to the Nicholson Organ and bears the date 1718.

In 1939, an extension of the Portsmouth Cathedral used granite from a quarry as far away as Pulau Ubin, Singapore, which was then a British colony.

Music

Music department

There are three choirs at the cathedral. The cathedral choir consists of up to 20 boys and a 'back row' of adult alto, tenor and bass singers made up of six choral scholars and six layclerks.  They sing Choral Evensong each Monday (low voices only), and Tuesday, Friday and Sunday (with the boys).  Cantate is the girls' choir, established in 2006 to sing Choral Evensong each Thursday. The Cathedral Consort (previously known as the Parish Choir) is a mixed choir of adults and younger singers which sings Choral Evensong on Saturdays and other periods outside term time. Often, the choirs combine to form the Great Choir, usually at large services and events.

The choirs regularly go on tour, with recent European visits including destinations such as Tallinn (Estonia), Stockholm (Sweden), Salzburg (Austria), Berlin (Germany), Gozo (Malta), Ypres (Belgium) and Notre Dame des Neiges in the Alpe d'Huez (France).

The Organist and Master of the Choristers, currently David Price, oversees the Music Department and is assisted by the sub-organist and Michael James Organ Scholar. Sachin Gunga has been sub-organist since January 2018. The Michael James Organ Scholar is appointed annually and is usually undertaken by an undergraduate during their gap year.

Cathedral organs

The cathedral's three-manual and pedal, forty-nine stop organ was installed in 1994 by Nicholson & Co Ltd. The pipes were taken from the John Nicholson organ of 1861 built for Manchester Cathedral, which had been relocated to Holy Trinity Church, Bolton, in 1874; it was rebuilt by Jardine & Co in 1905. In 2001, the West Great Organ was added, in order to provide music direct into the nave, which is pretty much a separate space. The renovated organ was officially inaugurated in November 2001, by a recital given by Olivier Latry, titular organist at Notre Dame de Paris. Finally, in 2017, horizontal Trompete de Maris fanfare reed division above the main entrance was added. 

In 2007, the cathedral introduced a single manual, three-stop chamber organ built by Kenneth Tickell & Co of Northampton.

Dean and chapter
As of 30 December 2020:
Dean — Anthony Cane (since 16 March 2019 installation)
Canon Chancellor and Vice Dean — Kathryn Percival (since December 2019)
Canon Precentor — Jo Spreadbury (since September 2015)
Diocesan Director of Social Enterprise and Engagement (Diocesan Canon) — Nick Ralph (since 2009)
Diocesan Head of Mission, Discipleship, and Ministry (Diocesan Canon) — Anthony Rustell (since 2014)

See also
List of cathedrals in the United Kingdom
List of places of worship in Portsmouth

References

External links

Official website
Cathedral Innovation Centre
Flickr images tagged Portsmouth Cathedral
32 Cathedral Images With Descriptions

Anglican cathedrals in England
Church of England church buildings in Hampshire
Religious buildings in Portsmouth
Tourist attractions in Portsmouth
Grade I listed churches in Hampshire
Grade I listed cathedrals
Anglican Diocese of Portsmouth
Religious organizations established in the 1180s
Thomas Becket